Bread bags or ration bags are small to medium-sized bags issued to soldiers to carry their rations and personal things. Often, such as in the case of Swiss and World War II German designs, they will have straps for attaching to belts and/or bikes.They can be commonly found in the military surplus market and are often bought by collectors and people finding new uses for them.

References

Personal military carrying equipment